Runs produced is a baseball statistic that can help estimate the number of runs a hitter contributes to his team. The formula adds together the player's runs and run batted in, and then subtracts the player's home runs.

Home runs are subtracted to compensate for the batter getting credit for both one run and at least one RBI when hitting a home run.

Unlike runs created, runs produced is a teammate-dependent stat in that it includes Runs and RBIs, which are affected by which batters bat near a player in the batting order. Also, subtracting home runs seems logical from an individual perspective, but on a team level it double-counts runs that are not home runs.

To counteract the double-counting, some have suggested an alternate formula which is the average of a player's runs scored and runs batted in.

Here, when a player scores a run, he shares the credit with the batter who drove him in, so both are credited with half a run produced. The same is true for an RBI, where credit is shared between the batter and runner. In the case of a home run, the batter is responsible for both the run scored and the RBI, so the runs produced are (1 + 1)/2 = 1, as expected.

All-time Major League Baseball leaders

See also
Baseball statistics

References

Batting statistics